Walter Rex Byrne (8 December 1906 – 23 May 1971) was an Australian rules footballer who played with Fitzroy in the Victorian Football League (VFL). Before landing at Fitzroy, Byrne played at Northcote, Mildura, Williamstown and Northcote again. After captain-coaching Mildura for part of 1930, Byrne was transferred back to Melbourne in his job with Victoria Police and joined his brother, Tom Byrne, at Williamstown for the rest of the 1930 season. He played eight games with 'Town, kicking eight goals before returning to Northcote in 1931.

Family
The son of John Byrne (1864 – 1955) and Phyllis Hannah Byrne, née Nattrass (1871 – 1950), Walter Rex Byrne was born at the western Victorian town of Nhill on 8 December 1906.

He was the brother of Fitzroy player Alex Byrne and Carlton, Hawthorn and Williamstown player Tom Byrne.

Notes

External links 

		
Rex Byrne's playing statistics from The VFA Project

1906 births
1971 deaths
Australian rules footballers from Victoria (Australia)
Northcote Football Club players
Williamstown Football Club players
Fitzroy Football Club players